Lavaca, Texas may refer to the following places along the Lavaca River

 Port Lavaca, Texas, formerly called simply "Lavaca"
 Lavaca County, Texas